State Route 192 (SR 192) is a state highway in the U.S. state of California. The route runs from State Route 154 near Santa Barbara to State Route 150 near the Santa Barbara–Ventura county line. The two-lane road is better known as Foothill Road, as the route runs parallel to the foothills of the Santa Ynez Mountains.

Route description
The western terminus is at State Route 154 in Santa Barbara at the intersection of San Marcos Pass Road, Cathedral Oaks Road, and Foothill Road. It runs east on Foothill Road, Mountain Drive, Stanwood Drive, Sycamore Canyon Road, East Valley Road, Toro Canyon Road, Foothill Road, then Casitas Pass Road. The eastern terminus is at State Route 150 near the Ventura/Santa Barbara County line at the intersection of Casitas Pass Road and Rincon Road.

The western portion of SR 192 is part of the National Highway System, a network of highways that are considered essential to the country's economy, defense, and mobility by the Federal Highway Administration.

History
This route was originally part of State Route 150, which was signed in 1934. It was renumbered to Route 192 in 1964.

Major intersections

See also

References

External links

California Highways: Route 192
Caltrans: Route 192 highway conditions
California @ AARoads.com - State Route 192
Video of entire 192 route going East

192
State Route 192
Santa Barbara, California